The Great Dawn (Italian: La grande aurora) is a 1947 Italian drama film directed by Giuseppe Maria Scotese and starring Renée Faure, Rossano Brazzi and Giovanni Grasso. The Greek actress and future star Yvonne Sanson made an early appearance in the film.

It was produced by Scalera Film and began production at the Cinevillaggio Studios complex in Venice during the wartime Italian Social Republic. The film's sets were designed by the art director Vittorio Valentini. Significant delays followed until its completion and release in postwar Italy.

A gifted young musical prodigy is encouraged to pursue his talents.

Cast
 Renée Faure as Anna Gamba  
 Rossano Brazzi as Renzo Gamba  
 Giovanni Grasso as Oreste Bellotti  
 Michele Riccardini as Don Terenzio  
 Yvonne Sanson as Daisy  
 Fausto Guerzoni as Fausto 
 Loris Gizzi as Cooky  
 Guglielmo Sinaz as Salesman 
 Dante Maggio 
 Pierino Gamba as Pierino, direttore d'orchestre

References

Bibliography 
 Moliterno, Gino. The A to Z of Italian Cinema. Scarecrow Press, 2009.

External links 
 

1947 films
Italian drama films
1947 drama films
1940s Italian-language films
Films directed by Giuseppe Maria Scotese
Italian black-and-white films
1940s Italian films